The John M. Wells House is a historic house at 491 Eastford Road in Southbridge, Massachusetts, United States.  The Wells family were the founders of the American Optical Company, a leading business in Southbridge.  The house John M. Wells had built in 1927 was reminiscent of a French chateau, and was the first to be built in the Cohasse  Farms section of Southbridge.  The only previous development in the rural area had been the development of the Cohasse  Country Club in 1919. Wells' cousin George would build a more modern house nearby in 1932.

The house was listed on the National Register of Historic Places in 1989.

See also
National Register of Historic Places listings in Southbridge, Massachusetts
National Register of Historic Places listings in Worcester County, Massachusetts

References

Renaissance Revival architecture in Massachusetts
Houses completed in 1927
Houses in Southbridge, Massachusetts
National Register of Historic Places in Southbridge, Massachusetts
Houses on the National Register of Historic Places in Worcester County, Massachusetts